Neoarius taylori (Taylor's catfish) is a species of fish in the family Ariidae. It is found in Indonesia and Papua New Guinea.

References

 

taylori
Fish of New Guinea
Taxonomy articles created by Polbot
Fish described in 1978